Espoir de Labé is a football club from Labé in the West African, state of Guinea. They play in the Guinée Championnat National, which is the highest league in Guinean football.

Stadium
Currently the team plays at the 5000 capacity Stade Saïfoulaye Diallo.

References

External links
Soccerway

Football clubs in Guinea
1984 establishments in Guinea